Mimocagosima humeralis is a species of beetle in the family Cerambycidae. It was described by J. Linsley Gressitt in 1951, originally under the genus Mandibularia. It is known from China.

References

Saperdini
Beetles described in 1951